

Roger Mears (born April 24, 1947 in Wichita, Kansas) is a former off-road driver who also drove in the USAC and CART Championship Car series.  He raced in the 1978–1984 seasons, with 31 combined career starts, and started in the 1982 and 1983 Indianapolis 500s. He finished in the top ten 17 times, with his best finish in 4th position achieved 3 times.

Following his IndyCar career, Mears returned to desert racing. Late in his career, he raced in four events during the 1995 NASCAR SuperTruck Series season, racing for Hendrick Motorsports, including the inaugural series race at Phoenix. His best career finish, however, was a 16th at Mesa Marin.

Roger is the father of NASCAR driver Casey Mears, and is 5 years older than his brother, Rick Mears, a 4-time Indianapolis 500 winner. He also is an atheist.

Since his own racing career ended, Mears has been heavily involved in Casey's career. He ran an Indy Lights team, with Casey as the driver, before working as a consultant with both Ganassi and Hendrick Motorsports.

Racing record

American open–wheel racing results
(key)

Complete USAC Mini-Indy Series results

USAC

CART

Indianapolis 500

NASCAR
(key) (Bold – Pole position awarded by qualifying time. Italics – Pole position earned by points standings or practice time. * – Most laps led.)

SuperTruck Series

References

External links

Living people
1947 births
American atheists
Sportspeople from Wichita, Kansas
Racing drivers from Kansas
Indianapolis 500 drivers
Off-road racing drivers
NASCAR drivers
Hendrick Motorsports drivers